In law, commercial speech is speech or writing  on behalf of a business with the intent of earning revenue or a profit. It is economic in nature and usually attempts to persuade consumers to purchase the business's product or service. The Supreme Court of the United States defines commercial speech as speech that "proposes a commercial transaction".

In the United States 
In the United States, commercial speech is "entitled to substantial First Amendment protection, albeit less than political, ideological, or artistic speech". In the 1980 case Central Hudson Gas & Electric Corp. v. Public Service Commission, the U.S. Supreme Court developed a four-part test to determine whether commercial speech regulation violates the First Amendment:
 Whether the commercial speech concerns a lawful activity and is not misleading
 Whether the government interest asserted to justify the regulation is "substantial"
 Whether the regulation "directly advances" that government interest
 Whether the regulation is no more extensive than necessary to serve that interest

History
Until the 1976 Supreme Court case Virginia State Pharmacy Board v. Virginia Citizens Consumer Council, commercial speech in the United States was viewed as an "unprotected" category of speech beyond the pale of First Amendment protection. Indeed, the term "commercial speech" was first introduced by the Supreme Court when it upheld Valentine v. Chrestensen in 1942, which ruled that commercial speech in public is not constitutionally protected. In 1976, Virginia State Board of Pharmacy v. Virginia Citizens Consumer Council ruled that states are not allowed to limit pharmacists in providing information about prescription drug prices. The case included a Virginia statute that restrained pharmacists from advertising prescription drug prices. This case is relevant as it resulted in the creation of the commercial speech doctrine, and ruled that purely commercial advertising gets First Amendment protection and has no constitutional restraints. Justice Blackmun noted, for the majority of the Court's ruling of 7-1, that while he believes while commercial speech should receive First Amendment protection, it should also still be regulated. In upholding the regulation, the Supreme Court said, "We are...clear that the Constitution imposes...no restraint on government as respects purely commercial advertising". This ruling, however, would be overturned with Virginia State Pharmacy Board v. Virginia Citizens Consumer Council (1976) and Central Hudson Gas & Electric Corp. v. Public Service Commission (1980).

The Court has recognized that commercial speech does not fall outside the purview of the First Amendment and has afforded commercial speech a measure of First Amendment protection "commensurate" with its position in relation to other constitutionally guaranteed expression. The Court has set forth a framework under Central Hudson for analyzing commercial speech under intermediate scrutiny:

Whereas Central Hudson limits what commercial speech can be said, another facet is related compelled commercial speech in the form of government-mandated disclaimers or other information required to be included in some forms of commercial speech. This concept was established as constitutional in Zauderer v. Office of Disciplinary Counsel of Supreme Court of Ohio, which established the Zauderer standard to judge which such government-mandated speech does not violate First Amendment rights of the commercial speaker. Zauderer found that the government can mandate commercial speech to include "purely factual and uncontroversial information" when it is reasonably related to the government's interest and "to dissipate the possibility of consumer confusion or deception". The Zauderer standard has since been expanded within Circuit Court case law to extend beyond protecting consumer deception as to include factual information for consumer awareness, such as food packaging information, as long as the information serves a reasonable government interest.

Criticism 
Members of the Supreme Court have expressed doubts about the Court's differential treatment of commercial speech in relation to other types of speech. Justice Clarence Thomas replied, in 44 Liquormart, Inc. v. Rhode Island (1996), that "I do not see a philosophical or historical basis for asserting that 'commercial' speech is of 'lower value' than 'noncommercial' speech." Justice Thomas would apply strict scrutiny to regulations of commercial speech. Justice Antonin Scalia expressed "discomfort with the Central Hudson test, which seem[ed to him] to have nothing more than policy intuition to support it".

U.S. Court of Appeals judge Alex Kozinski criticized the 1942 Valentine v. Chrestensen ruling, stating that "the Supreme Court plucked the commercial speech doctrine out of thin air".

In the European Union 
The European Court of Human Rights has held that commercial speech is protected under Article 10 of the European Convention on Human Rights (ECHR) on several occasions since the 1980s, but lacks a counterpart to the commercial speech doctrine that exists under U.S. law.

In Germany, the courts adopted a strict approach to advertising and commercial speech due to its emphasis on ensuring competition. For example, in Barthold v. Germany (1985), the European Court of Human Rights held that enjoining a veterinary surgeon for advocating for 24-hour animal clinics (which did not exist at the time in Hamburg, Germany) violated his free expression rights. After the vet was quoted in a newspaper article, he was sued for violating the veterinary association's rules of professional conduct, which barred vets from advertising, and he was injuncted from making similar statements in the future.

In the 1990 Markt Intern Verlag GmbH and Klaus Beermann v. Germany case—described Europe's "leading case concerning speech in commercial context"—the European Court of Human Rights concluded that there had been no violation of Article 10 when Germany's Federal Court of Justice prohibited a publishing company from repeating statements that had been published in a specialist information bulletin criticizing the practices of another company. It noted that the prohibition did not exceed the "margin of appreciation which national authorities were allowed in laying down, in accordance with Article 10, §2, formalities, conditions, restrictions or penalties on the exercise of freedom of expression".

See also 
 First Amendment to the United States Constitution
 Freedom of speech
 Professional speech
 Central Hudson Gas & Electric Corp. v. Public Service Commission
 Anonymous Online Speakers v. United States District Court for the District of Nevada
 Valentine v. Chrestensen

References 

Advertising
American legal terminology